Regalo de Reyes ("Christmas Present") is a 1942 Mexican film. It stars Sara García.

External links
 

1942 films
1940s Spanish-language films
Mexican black-and-white films
Mexican drama films
1942 drama films
1940s Mexican films